Donald Pilon may refer to:
Donald Pilon (actor) (born 1938), Canadian actor
Donald Pilon (politician), American politician